Scaptesyle ixias is a moth in the subfamily Arctiinae first described by George Hampson in 1900. It is found on the Indonesian islands of Nias and Java.

References

Lithosiini